A lancer is a cavalry soldier who fights with a lance.

Lancer may also refer to:

Military
Rockwell B-1 Lancer, a strategic bomber used by the United States Air Force
Lockheed CL-1200 Lancer, a late-1960s proposed update to the F-104 Starfighter
Republic P-43 Lancer, a single-engine fighter first delivered to the United States Army Air Corps in 1940
Sperry Lancer, an American surface-to-air missile system that never reached production; see FIM-43 Redeye
Mikoyan-Gurevich MiG-21 Lancer, a variant of the MiG-21 made for the Romanian Air Force
HAL Lancer, a variant of the Aérospatiale SA 315B Lama helicopter
The nickname for VMFA-212, U.S. Marine Fighter Attack Squadron 212
Lancer Barracks, a historic military facility and grounds in Parramatta, New South Wales, Australia
Operation Lancer, a 1942 Dutch and Australian World War II operation on Timor

Transportation
Austin Lancer, a passenger car produced by the British Motor Corporation of Australia between 1958 and 1964
Dodge Lancer, a car produced from 1955 to 1962 and 1985–1989
Shelby Lancer, a limited-production hatchback sports sedan based on the Dodge Lancer
Mitsubishi Lancer, a car produced since 1973
Type C7 ship (Lancer class), a designation for a cargo ship and the first purpose-built container ship
Champion Lancer, a twin-engine training plane produced in 1963 by Champion Aircraft

Sports
Omaha Lancers, a United States Hockey League franchise
Longwood Lancers, the sports teams of Longwood University in Farmville, Virginia
Rochester Lancers (disambiguation), several soccer teams in Rochester, New York
UV Green Lancers, the sports teams of the University of the Visayas in Cebu City, Philippines
Windsor Lancers, the sports teams of the University of Windsor in Ontario, Canada

The athletics teams of numerous high schools are named Lancers:

Lasalle Secondary School in Greater Sudbury, Ontario, Canada
Lakenheath High School on the American base at RAF Lakenheath in England
Salpointe Catholic High School in Tucson, Arizona
In California:
Lakeside High School (Lake Elsinore, California)
La Serna High School in Whittier
Sunny Hills High School in Fullerton
East Union High School in Manteca
Carlsbad High School (Carlsbad, California)
Hilltop High School in Chula Vista
Saint Francis High School (Mountain View)
Waterford High School (Connecticut) in Waterford, Connecticut
Belleville Township High School East in Belleville, Illinois
Shawnee Mission East High School in Prairie Village, Kansas
Linganore High School in Frederick, Maryland
Livingston High School (Livingston, New Jersey)
Lewiston-Porter High School, in the Lewiston-Porter Central School District, Youngstown, New York
Longmeadow High School in Longmeadow, Massachusetts
Malden Catholic High School in Malden, Massachusetts
Manchester High School in Midlothian, Virginia
La Salle High School (Cincinnati, Ohio)
General McLane High School in Edinboro, Pennsylvania
Loyalsock Township High School in Pennsylvania
John R. Lewis High School, Springfield, Virginia
South Umpqua High School in Myrtle Creek, Oregon
Lawrence High School (Massachusetts) in Lawrence, Massachusetts

In entertainment
Lancer (TV series), a 1969 western series
One of the supporting characters in Fate/stay night, an adult Japanese visual novel
A gargantuan robot featured in the video game Sonic Unleashed, called the Egg Lancer
The nickname for Lance Belmont, a character from the fictional Robotech Universe
The surname of Mr. Lancer, a teacher from the Danny Phantom universe
Lancer, a major character from the video game Deltarune
A character in the television series My Little Pony Tales
Lancer Assault Rifle, a weapon in the video game Gears of War featuring a chainsaw bayonet
A weapon in the video game Ratchet & Clank: Going Commando, one of the game's starting weapons
A fictional university in the television series Hellcats
A nickname for hunters who primarily use the "Lance" class weapon in the video game Monster Hunter
"Lancer", a 2018 track by Toby Fox from Deltarune Chapter 1 OST from the video game Deltarune

Other
Lancer, Saskatchewan, a small village in Canada
The U.S. Secret Service codename for President John F. Kennedy
Lancers (wine brand), a brand of sparkling wine from Portugal
Lancer Books, a publishing house

See also
Les Lanciers or The Lancers, a form of dance
Lancero (English: Lancer), a Colombian National Army training course